Zaitzeviaria bicolor, is a species of riffle beetle found in Sri Lanka, Philippines and Vietnam.

Adults beetles are found in the underface of stones in the current.

References 

Elmidae
Insects of Sri Lanka
Insects described in 1923